The 2nd European Athletics Championships was a continental athletics competition for European athletes which was held in two places in 1938. The men's event took place in Paris, France between 3–5 September while the women's events were in Vienna, Austria (at the time part of Nazi Germany) on 17 and 18 September. A total of 32 events were contested at the two competitions, comprising 23 events for men and 9 for women. This was the first time that events for women were held and the only occasion on which the competition was held in two separate locations.

Nazi Germany topped the medals table with twelve gold medals and 32 in total. Finland won the second greatest number of gold medals (5) and eleven medals in total. The next most successful nations were Great Britain (four golds and eight overall) and Sweden (three golds and a total of thirteen medals). France won a medal of each colour in Paris, with Prudent Joye the sole Frenchman to win a gold for the hosts of the men's championships.

In the men's competition at Stade Olympique de Colombes in Paris, Donald Finlay of Great Britain broke the European record to win the 110 metres hurdles. Tinus Osendarp of the Netherlands won a sprint double, breaking two championship records. World record holder Sydney Wooderson took victory in the 1500 metres while Olympic gold medallists Matti Järvinen (javelin), Karl Hein (hammer) and Harold Whitlock (50 km walk) won their specialities. Finnish runners Taisto Mäki, Ilmari Salminen and Väinö Muinonen won all three of the long distance running events at the championships, upholding the country's reputation as the Flying Finns. Contemporaneous reports on the men's event were given in the Glasgow Herald.

Stanisława Walasiewicz of Poland excelled in the women's events at the Ernst-Happel-Stadion in Vienna, winning both the 100 and 200 metres, as well as silver medals in the long jump and 4 x 100 metres relay. Italian athlete Claudia Testoni set a world record of 11.6 seconds over the 80 metres hurdles. Outside these highlights, the German women dominated the competition by winning 15 of the 27 women's medals on offer. Among them were Käthe Krauß (who won two silvers in the sprints), 1936 Berlin Olympics champion Gisela Mauermayer (who won the discus and a silver in the shot put) and Lisa Gelius, who completed a usual double of silver in the hurdles and gold in the javelin throw. Among the minor medallists was Fanny Blankers-Koen, who won the first international medals of her highly successful career. Dora Ratjen was the initial winner of the women's high jump, but this was rescinded after it was discovered that he was in fact a man. A contemporaneous report on the women's event was given in the Glasgow Herald.

Medal summary
Complete results were published.

Men

Women

Medal table

Participation
According to an unofficial count, 350 athletes from 23 countries participated in the event, two athletes less than the official number of 352 as published.

 (2)
 (13)
 (3)
 (3)
 (7)
 (21)
 (43)
 (50)
 (5)
 (25)
 (37)
 (3)
 (2)
 (5)
 (14)
 (10)
 (15)
 (1)
 (2)
 (35)
 (17)
 (35)
 (2)

References

External links 
 European Athletics

 
European Athletics Championships
European Athletics Championships
European Athletics Championships
International athletics competitions hosted by Germany
International athletics competitions hosted by France
European Athletics Championships
Sports competitions in Vienna
Athletics
1938 in European sport
1938 in Paris
1930s in Vienna
September 1938 sports events
1938 in Austrian sport